Jovibarba globifera, common name rolling hen-and-chicks, is a species of  succulent flowering plant in the family Crassulaceae.

Subspecies
Jovibarba globifera subsp. allionii (Jord. & Fourr.) J. Parnell 
Jovibarba globifera subsp. arenaria (W. D. J. Koch) J. Parn. 
Jovibarba globifera subsp. globifera - Hens-and-chickens House-leek
Jovibarba globifera subsp. hirta (L.) J. Parn. 
Jovibarba globifera subsp. lagariniana Gallo

Description
Rosette leaf blades are spatulate, curved, fleshy, with entire margin, usually with reddish-brown tips, while stem leaf blades are ovate. They bloom from June to August.

Rolling hen-and-chicks produce small globe-shaped offsets ("globi") that are lightly attached and easily pop off and roll away from the mother plant. Offsets survive the main rosette, which is monocarpic. They reproduce via offsets in addition to producing seeds via sexual reproduction.

Distribution
Jovibarba globifera lives in the eastern and southern Alps, the Carpathians and the western Balkans south to northern Albania.

Habitat

External links
Biolib
Nature Gate
Luirig.altervista
Hortipedia

Crassulaceae
Flora of Europe